The Realistic DX-300 is a shortwave radio manufactured by General Research of Electronics (GRE) of Chiba, Japan and marketed in the United States by Radio Shack (Tandy Corporation) from late 1978 through 1979.  The radio's theory of operation is based on the principle of the Wadley Loop and was one of the first radios marketed by Tandy Corporation to have a digital frequency display. The DX-300 was succeeded by the improved DX-302 in 1980.

External links
 General Research of Electronics

Amateur radio receivers